Bald Rock National Park is a national park in northern New South Wales, Australia, just north of Tenterfield on the Queensland border.  The border passes over the rock on the Western side. On the other side of the border national park continues as the Girraween National Park.

The park is named after its most prominent feature, Bald Rock, which is a large granite outcrop rising about 200 metres above the surrounding landscape. Measuring about 750 metres long and 500 metres wide this is the largest granite monolith in Australia. Access to the rock is provided by a sealed road into the park and walking tracks to the summit.  Two tracks are marked, a steep one up the exposed face, or an easier gradient through bushland around the back. The Bungoona Walking Track, built in 1980, goes more gently up the eastern side of Bald Rock and winds through forest. It passes through some granite boulder formations, including an arch, covered in mosses, ferns and orchids.  The summit offers panoramic views of the surrounding bushland, but vegetation on top prevents a full 360° view. The views are so expansive, mountains as far north as the Queensland/New South Wales border can be seen, such as Mount Barney, Mount Lindesay and Flinders Peak, and as far south as Mount MacKenzie, south of Tenterfield.

The park is in the New England granite belt, where about 220 million years ago an episode of granite magmatism resulted in the intrusion of the Stanthorpe Adamellite into the surrounding metamorphic and sedimentary rock.  Subsequent uplift and erosion of the New England Fold Belt has seen the majority of the surrounding sediments and metamorphic rocks eroded away, with the Stanthorpe Adamellite remaining due to its resistance to weathering.

This regolith has created a landscape with many exposed inselbergs of granite rocks, some balancing on top of each other, or forming natural arches.

Just off the main road from Tenterfield to the park is Thunderbolt's Hideout, a set of caves and overhanging granite rocks.  It was thought to have been used by bushranger Captain Thunderbolt. A little further along the same road are some historic World War II tank traps.

See also
Protected areas of New South Wales
High Conservation Value Old Growth forest
Captain Thunderbolt's Rock

References

Bald Rock National Park at the NSW National Parks and Wildlife Service
Captain Thunderbolts Hideout at NSW Schools Country Area Program

National parks of New South Wales
Protected areas established in 1971
1971 establishments in Australia